Michael Hornsby (born 23 November 1998) is a German professional footballer who plays as a defender for Richmond Kickers in USL League One.

Career

Youth, College & Amateur
Hornsby attended Pestalozzi-Gymnasium Biberach, whilst also playing as part of the SC Freiburg  academy and later the FV Ravensburg academy, the former of which he competed with for a single season.

In 2017, Hornsby moved to the United States to play college soccer at Queens University of Charlotte. In three seasons with then Royals, Hornsby made 54 appearances, scoring six goals and tallying 13 assists. In those three seasons, Hornsby was a three-time First-Team All-SAC performer, also earning NCCSIA All-State honors three times, including a pair of First-Team commendations, and was a two-time pick on United Soccer Coaches All-Region team.

In 2020, Hornsby transferred to the University of North Carolina Wilmington, going to make 26 appearances for the Seahawks. Here he was a Third-Team All-Colonial Athletic Association selection in the 2020–21 season. Following the 2021 season, he was a Second-Team All-Colonial Athletic Association selection, and received Third-Team All-Atlantic Region honors by the United Soccer Coaches.

During his college career, Hornsby also played a single game for NPSL side Chattanooga FC during their 2018 season. In 2021, Hornsby competed with USL League Two's South Georgia Tormenta 2, where he finished the regular season with six assists in 13 appearances.

Professional
Hornsby signed with Central Valley Fuego on 22 March 2022, ahead of their inaugural season in USL League One. He made his debut for the club on 23 April 2022, starting in a 3–0 loss to Union Omaha.

Ahead of the 2022 season, Hornsby signed with USL League One side Richmond Kickers.

References

External links
Michael Hornsby - 2019 - Men's Soccer Queens Athletics
Michael Hornsby - Men's Soccer UNCW Athletics

1998 births
Living people
People from Biberach an der Riss
Sportspeople from Tübingen (region)
German footballers
Footballers from Baden-Württemberg
Association football defenders
National Premier Soccer League players
USL League One players
USL League Two players
SC Freiburg players
FV Ravensburg players
UNC Wilmington Seahawks men's soccer players
Chattanooga FC players
Tormenta FC 2 players
Central Valley Fuego FC players
Richmond Kickers players
German expatriate footballers
German expatriate sportspeople in the United States
Expatriate soccer players in the United States